Kerman (formerly Collis) is a city at the intersection of State Route 180 and State Route 145 in Fresno County, California, United States. The population was 13,544 at the 2010 census.

History
Around 1891, the Southern Pacific Railroad constructed a new line between Tracy and Fresno. A watering tank and pump on that line was the beginning of Kerman, which was christened Collis in honor of the President of the road, Collis Potter Huntington. The first inhabitant, the caretaker of the pump and tank, kept the tank full of water for the thirsty engines with their long and lumbering trains. After some months, he resigned his job, not because of the work, he said, but because it was too lonesome and he was tired of being a hermit. He said he never saw anyone but the train crews and they were always in too big a hurry to carry on a conversation.

On August 3, 1892, the train bandits Chris Evans, John Sontag, and George Contant robbed a Southern Pacific train at Collis.  Contant went to Folsom State Prison for the crime. Evans and John Sontag became fugitives for ten months before they were captured in 1893 in what is called the Battle of Stone Corral. John Sontag died of his wounds in custody, and Chris Evans was also sent to Folsom upon his conviction of the crime.

As a speculative venture, the old and very rich Bank of California purchased a huge tract of land in every County of California. The arid, barren land around Kerman seemed to be a good venture, so that happened to be the allotment for Fresno County.

After the death of its promoter, the bank became insolvent and its property was liquidated. The property here attracted the attention of two Los Angeles capitalists, William G. Kerckhoff and Jacob Mansar, who saw a chance to purchase a plentiful water supply from the newly constructed Enterprise Canal, which had its source in the Kings River. The men combined the first three letters of each of their names and christened the area "Kerman."  They pitched the property to Scandinavians and Germans settled in the Midwest.

The Collis post office was opened in 1894, closed in 1899, re-established in 1904, and renamed Kerman in 1906. Kerman incorporated in 1946. The independent Kerman Telephone company retired its four-position manual telephone switchboard, described by a state telephone association as the last of its kind in California, in 1991.

Geography

Demographics

2010
At the 2010 census Kerman had a population of 13,544. The racial makeup of Kerman was 6,860 (50.6%) White, 68 (0.5%) African American, 173 (1.3%) Native American, 1,091 (8.1%) Asian, 14 (0.1%) Pacific Islander, 4,675 (34.5%) from other races, and 663 (4.9%) from two or more races. Hispanic or Latino of any race were 9,711 persons (71.7%).

The census reported that 13,537 people (99.9% of the population) lived in households, 2 (0%) lived in non-institutionalized group quarters, and 5 (0%) were institutionalized.

There were 3,692 households, 2,160 (58.5%) had children under the age of 18 living in them, 2,248 (60.9%) were opposite-sex married couples living together, 615 (16.7%) had a female householder with no husband present, 272 (7.4%) had a male householder with no wife present.  There were 285 (7.7%) unmarried opposite-sex partnerships, and 25 (0.7%) same-sex married couples or partnerships. 460 households (12.5%) were one person and 208 (5.6%) had someone living alone who was 65 or older. The average household size was 3.67.  There were 3,135 families (84.9% of households); the average family size was 3.97.

The age distribution was 4,648 people (34.3%) under the age of 18, 1,469 people (10.8%) aged 18 to 24, 3,870 people (28.6%) aged 25 to 44, 2,580 people (19.0%) aged 45 to 64, and 977 people (7.2%) who were 65 or older.  The median age was 28.2 years. For every 100 females, there were 99.6 males.  For every 100 females age 18 and over, there were 96.9 males.

There were 3,908 housing units at an average density of ,of which 3,692 were occupied, 2,165 (58.6%) by the owners and 1,527 (41.4%) by renters.  The homeowner vacancy rate was 3.3%; the rental vacancy rate was 4.9%.  8,215 people (60.7% of the population) lived in owner-occupied housing units and 5,322 people (39.3%) lived in rental housing units.

2000
At the 2000 census there were 8,551 people in 2,389 households, including 1,994 families, in the city.  The population density was 1,528.5/km (3,951.2/mi2).  There were 2,462 housing units at an average density of 440.1/km (1,137.6/mi2).  The racial makeup of the city was 42.50% White, 0.36% Black or African American, 1.95% Native American, 8.29% Asian, 0.02% Pacific Islander, 42.38% from other races, and 4.49% from two or more races.  64.93% of the population were Hispanic or Latino of any race.
Of the 2,389 households 51.8% had children under the age of 18 living with them, 61.4% were married couples living together, 15.2% had a female householder with no husband present, and 16.5% were non-families. 13.8% of households were one person and 7.3% were one person aged 65 or older.  The average household size was 3.57 and the average family size was 3.91.

The age distribution was 35.3% under the age of 18, 11.4% from 18 to 24, 28.7% from 25 to 44, 16.5% from 45 to 64, and 8.1% 65 or older.  The median age was 27 years. For every 100 females, there were 97.9 males.  For every 100 females age 18 and over, there were 97.9 males.

The median household income was $31,188 and the median family income  was $34,120. Males had a median income of $29,120 versus $21,906 for females. The per capita income for the city was $11,495.  20.2% of the population and 19.1% of families were below the poverty line.   25.1% of those under the age of 18 and 6.3% of those 65 and older were living below the poverty line.

Education
The Kerman Unified School District is the school district serving Kerman and the surrounding areas.

Public
 Kerman High School
 Kerman Middle School 
 Enterprise High School (formerly Nova High School)
 Sun Empire Elementary School
 Kerman-Floyd Elementary School
 Goldenrod Elementary School
Liberty Elementary School

Private
 Kerman Christian School (on Kerman Covenant Church campus)

Points of interest
 M. Young Botanic Garden

Sister city relations 
 Kannami, Shizuoka Prefecture, Japan - since October 12, 1985

References

External links

Kerman Photo History Kermanphotos

Incorporated cities and towns in California
Cities in Fresno County, California
Populated places established in 1891
1891 establishments in California